Icta is a genus of moths in the subfamily Lymantriinae. The genus was erected by Francis Walker in 1855. Both species are found in Australia.

Species
Icta fulviceps Walker, 1855
Icta tanaopis Turner, 1921 Queensland

References

Lymantriinae
Noctuoidea genera